Bruce Lonsdale (November 10, 1949 – January 22, 1982) was a Canadian politician.  He represented the riding of Timiskaming in the House of Commons of Canada from 1980 to 1982. He was a member of the Liberal Party.

He served as mayor of the town of Cobalt before seeking the Liberal nomination for the federal riding of Timiskaming.

Lonsdale died in a two-car head-on crash 10 kilometres west of North Bay on Highway 17 on January 22, 1982. He was 32 years old.

External links
 

1949 births
1982 deaths
Accidental deaths in Ontario
Liberal Party of Canada MPs
Mayors of places in Ontario
Members of the House of Commons of Canada from Ontario
People from Cobalt, Ontario
Road incident deaths in Canada